The 1963 All-Ireland Senior Football Championship was the 77th staging of the All-Ireland Senior Football Championship, the Gaelic Athletic Association's premier inter-county Gaelic football tournament. The championship began on 5 May 1963 and ended on 22 September 1963. As of 2018, it remains the last All Ireland Senior Football Championship season to be completed without any draws.

Kilkenny dropped from the championship until 1975.

Kerry entered the championship as the defending champions, however, they were defeated by Galway in the All-Ireland semi-final.

On 22 September 1963, Dublin won the championship following a 1-9 to 0-10 defeat of Galway in the All-Ireland final. This was their 17th All-Ireland title and their first in five championship seasons.

Dublin's Mickey Whelan was the championship's top scorer with 1-20. His teammate Lar Foley was the choice for Texaco Footballer of the Year.

Results

Connacht Senior Football Championship

Quarter-final

 
Semi-finals

Final

Leinster Senior Football Championship

First round

Quarter-finals

Semi-finals

Final

Munster Senior Football Championship

Quarter-final

Semi-finals

Final

Ulster Senior Football Championship

Preliminary round

Quarter-finals

Semi-finals

Final

All-Ireland Senior Football Championship

Semi-finals

Final

Championship statistics

Scoring

Overall

Single game

Miscellaneous

 Kilkenny dropped from the Leinster football championship until 1975 after a 1 sided defeat to Carlow.
 The All Ireland semi-final between Dublin and Down was their first championship meeting.
 The attendance of 87,106 at the All-Ireland final between Dublin and Galway was the third highest on record.

References

All-Ireland Senior Football Championship